Prisoners from the Front is an 1866 painting by American artist Winslow Homer. One of Homer's most notable early works, the painting depicts a scene in which Confederate officers surrender to Union Brigadier General Francis Channing Barlow during the American Civil War. Homer's experience as a war correspondent likely contributed to his rendering of the work. 

Citing Prisoners' style, tone, and provenance, American art critic Peter Schjeldahl once called Homer's work "The most telling of all paintings about the Civil War."

Infrared photography and numerous studies indicate that the painting underwent many changes in the course of completion.

References 

1866 paintings
Paintings in the collection of the Metropolitan Museum of Art
Paintings by Winslow Homer
American Civil War in art